Manner is a line of confectionery from the Austrian conglomerate, Josef Manner & Comp AG. The corporation, founded in 1890, produces a wide assortment of confectionery products. These include wafers, long-life confectionery, chocolate-based confectionery, sweets, cocoa and a variety of seasonal products.

The company's best-known product are the "Neapolitan wafers", introduced in 1898. They are sold in blocks of ten 47 x 17 x 17 mm hazelnut-cream filled wafers. The hazelnuts were originally imported from the Naples region in Italy, hence the name. The basic recipe has remained unchanged to this day.

The company logo is a picture of St Stephen's Cathedral in Vienna. This dates to the 1890s, when Josef Manner (1865–1947) opened his first shop next to the cathedral.  The Archdiocese of Vienna and the Manner Company agreed that the company may use the cathedral in its logo in return for funding the wages of one stonemason performing repair work on the structure.

See also
St. Stephen's Cathedral, Vienna

References

External links 
 Manner.com +

Brand name confectionery
Manufacturing companies based in Vienna
Food and drink companies based in Vienna
Austrian brands